SoDo, alternatively SODO, is a neighborhood in Seattle, Washington, that makes up part of the city's Industrial District. It is bounded on the north by South King Street, beyond which is Pioneer Square; on the south by South Spokane Street, beyond which is more of the Industrial District; on the west by the Duwamish River, across which is West Seattle; and on the east by Metro Transit's Downtown Seattle Transit Tunnel and SoDo Busway, beyond which is the International District and the rest of the Industrial District.

SoDo was originally named for being located "south of the (King) dome," but since the stadium's demolition in 2000, the name has been taken to mean "south of downtown." The moniker was adopted in the 1990s after the renaming of the Sears building to the SODO Center (later Starbucks Center, the world headquarters of Starbucks at First Avenue S. and S. Lander Street). It includes Seattle's downtown stadium district of T-Mobile Park (where Major League Baseball's Seattle Mariners play their home baseball games) and Lumen Field (built on the former Kingdome site; where the NFL's Seattle Seahawks along with the XFL's Seattle Sea Dragons play their home football games and where Major League Soccer's Seattle Sounders FC along with the National Women's Soccer League's OL Reign play their home soccer matches). The Mariners' popular marketing campaign in the early 2000s used the SoDo moniker in the catchphrase "SoDo Mojo".

SoDo deliberately echoes SoHo in New York City, where, during the 1970s, cheap spaces vacated by departing factories were converted by artists into lofts and studios. SoDo has undergone a similar process but has not experienced much of the gentrification experienced by its putative model. Some of SoDo's warehouse buildings remain in their original use; others have been carved up for artists' lofts, art galleries, and an assortment of other businesses. As one travels farther south along First Avenue S., these conversions peter out, and light manufacturing, warehouses, and warehouse-style retail stores predominate.

Demographics

As of the 2000 United States census, SoDo had a population of 2,602, with a median age of 41.2, in 458 owner-occupied residences and 536 rentals. The average annual household income was $42,208. The racial breakdown was 41% White, 28% Asian, 14% Black, 9% Hispanic/Latino, 3% American Indian/Alaska Native, and 5% other.

Transportation

SoDo main thoroughfares are First and Fourth Avenues S. and Alaskan Way S. (north- and south-bound) and S. Lander and Holgate Streets, Edgar Martínez Drive S., and S. Royal Brougham Way (east- and west-bound).

The neighborhood is also served by public transit service. Sound Transit operates Central Link light rail service through the neighborhood, stopping at two stations: SODO at Lander Street, and Stadium at Royal Brougham Way. The SODO Busway runs along 5th Avenue South and carries bus routes from King County Metro and Sound Transit Express.

References

External links
 
"SoDo rezone pits industry against developers", Seattle Daily Journal of Commerce, September 26, 2002.
"It's gritty, blue-collar and sometimes home" Seattle Post-Intelligencer, April 11, 1998
The proposed SODO Urban Art Corridor
The SODO Business Association

 
Economy of Seattle
Warehouse districts of the United States